The 1971 National Professional Soccer League season was the first season of the National Professional Soccer League. Orlando Pirates won the inaugural title.

At the time, due to the country's apartheid policies, the competition was only open to black South African teams, and it ran in parallel with the FPL and the NFL.

Table

References 

1971 in South African sport
National Professional Soccer League (South Africa) seasons